Unbundling is a neologism to describe how  the  ubiquity of mobile devices, Internet connectivity, consumer web technologies, social media and information access  in the 21st century is affecting older institutions (education, broadcasting, newspapers,  games, shopping, etc.) by "break[ing] up the packages they 
once offered (possibly even for free), providing particular parts of them at a scale and cost unmatchable by the old order." Unbundling has been called "the great disruptor".

Etymology
"Unbundling" most basically means simply the "process of breaking apart something into smaller parts." In the context of mergers and acquisitions, unbundling refers to the "process by which a large company with several different lines of business retains one or more core businesses and sells off the remaining assets, product/service lines, divisions or subsidiaries."

Examples
Massive open online courses are "part of a trend towards the unbundling of higher education"   by providing access to  recorded lectures, online tests, and digital documents as a complement to traditional classroom instruction. Online program management providers are also increasingly unbundling services in higher education, which some argue "reflects increasing sophistication—and capacity—of colleges and universities as they launch new online programs."
Software unbundling Some IBM Computer software "products" were distributed "free" (no charge for the software itself, a common practice early in the industry). The term "Program Product" was used by IBM to denote that it's not for free.
One of IBM's COBOL Compilers was "PP 5688-197 IBM COBOL for MVS and VM   1.2.0" which one IBMer described as Quote PP := "Program Product" aka "you pay for it" EndQuote. By contrast, the same source had: Neither the F or D versions of the COBOL compiler were ever "rented" ... (or) even copyrighted... 
The majority of software packages written by IBM were available at no charge to IBM customers. (Even non-IBM customers could pay (only) for the reproduction costs and get them from IBM.  All this changed, of course, with New World (June 1969), but that didn't alter the status of products released prior to that date."
Pandora Radio
The addition of Maryland and Rutgers to the Big Ten Conference was described as part of a larger trend towards the unbundling of each university's broadcast rights to maintain profitability.
The CEO of Mashable predicted that unbundled news contents' "microcontent sharing" via software like Flipboard (Android and iOS), Zite and  Spun (iPhone) would be a major trend in 2013.
 LinkedIn has embraced a multi-app strategy and now has a family of six separate apps—The LinkedIn 'Mothership' app and 'satellite' apps ranging from job search to tailored news 
 The customers that live in large apartment complexes and multiple dwelling units can be unbundled in a way that allows multiple providers to reach each of the different units.

See also
Information Age
 Creative destruction
 Disruptive innovation
 Asset stripping
 Leapfrogging
 List of emerging technologies
 Obsolescence
 Paradigm shift
 Technology strategy
 Killer application

References

External links
Alan Jacobs, The Great Unbundling of the University theatlantic.com January 23, 2012
Benjamin Lima, Massive online learning and the unbundling of undergraduate education    July 17, 2012
McKinsey & Company Unbundling the corporation June 2000 
Justin Reich, Will Technology Lead to the Unbundling of Schools? Education Week,   May 17, 2012

Technology neologisms
Technology in society